Giant centipede may refer to a wide range of large centipedes, notably:

Ethmostigmus rubripes, a large centipede found in Australia, New Guinea, Solomon Islands, Indonesia, Southeast Asia and China
Scolopendra gigantea, the largest species of centipede in the world, found in tropical South America and Trinidad
Any centipede of the genus Scolopendra, which contains over 70 known species, all of which can reach a length of at least 10 cm (4 inches), with many species exceeding 20 cm (8 inches).

Animal common name disambiguation pages